James N. Baldwin is an American attorney and academic administrator who has served as the third President of Excelsior College since October 2016.

Education 
Baldwin earned a Bachelor of Arts in political science from Union College and a Juris Doctor from Albany Law School.

Career 
After graduating from law school, Baldwin was admitted to the New York State Bar Association. Baldwin served as CEO and superintendent of Questar III BOCES, an organization that provides educational and administrative services to three counties in New York. Baldwin also served as chief of staff and acting deputy commissioner for higher education in the New York State Education Department and deputy executive Secretary of State of New York. Baldwin joined Excelsior College in 2014 as the school's executive vice president. He was selected to serve as president in October 2016. Baldwin is scheduled to retire on July 31, 2020, and will be succeeded by David Schejbal.

References 

American academic administrators
Union College (New York) alumni
Albany Law School alumni
Living people
Year of birth missing (living people)